Lev Stepanovich Dyomin (11 January 1926 – 18 December 1998) was a Soviet cosmonaut who flew on the Soyuz 15 spaceflight in 1974. This spaceflight was intended to dock with the space station Salyut 3, but the docking failed.

Biography 
Dyomin was born in Moscow. He gained a doctoral degree in engineering from the Soviet Air Force Engineering Academy and the rank of Colonel in the Soviet Air Force.

Aged 48 at the time of his flight on Soyuz 15, he was the oldest cosmonaut up to that point as well as the first grandfather to go into space. He remained in the program until leaving in 1982 to pursue deep-sea research. Dyomin died of cancer, in Zvyozdny Gorodok, in 1998.

He was awarded:
Hero of the Soviet Union
Pilot-Cosmonaut of the USSR
Order of Lenin
Order of the Red Banner of Labour
Medal "For Battle Merit"
Medal "For the Development of Virgin Lands"
Order of the Banner of the People's Republic of Bulgaria

References

1926 births
1998 deaths
Engineers from Moscow
Heroes of the Soviet Union
Recipients of the Order of Lenin
Recipients of the Order of the Red Banner of Labour
Russian philatelists
Soviet cosmonauts
Deaths from cancer in Russia
Cosmonauts from Moscow